The second set of Highland Council wards, 80 in number, became effective for election purposes in 1999, for the second general election of the Highland Council, and were used also for the third general election in 2003. These wards replaced 72 older wards, and were themselves replaced by a set of 22 wards for the fourth general election in 2007.

The Highland Council (Comhairle na Gaidhealtachd in  Gaelic) had become a local government authority in 1996, when the two-tier system of regions and districts was abolished and the Highland region became a unitary council area, under the Local Government etc (Scotland) Act 1994. The first Highland Council election, however, was one year earlier, in 1995. Until 1996 councillors shadowed the regional and district councils and planned for the transfer of powers and responsibilities. Elections to the council are normally on a four-year cycle, all wards being contestable at each election.

For the periods 1995 to 1999 and 1999 to 2007, each ward elected one councillor by the first past the post system. In 2007, this arrangement was replaced with one of multi-member wards, each electing three or four councillors by the single transferable vote system, to produce a form of proportional representation.

The wards used from 1995 to 1999 had been subdivisions of eight council management areas, with councillors elected from each area forming an area committee. The wards created in 1999, however, were not exactly subdivisions of the management areas, management area boundaries were not adjusted to take account of new ward boundaries and, therefore, area committees ceased to be exactly representative of areas for which they were named and for which they took decisions.

In 2007, the management areas were replaced with three new corporate management areas, each consisting of a whole number of the new multi-member wards.

Lists of wards, 1999 to 2007 

Wards are listed by management area to which linked for area committee purposes.

Badenoch and Strathspey wards 
There were five wards related to the Badenoch and Strathspey management area:

Caithness wards 
There were 10 wards related to the Caithness management area:

Inverness wards 

The management area included Loch Ness, Strathglass and the former royal burgh of Inverness.

Inverness was granted city status in 2001 and the Highland Council then used the 'city' title in reference to the Inverness management area. Letters patent refer, however, to the 'Town of Inverness' and, although there is a former 'royal burgh' which had defined boundaries, there is no 'town' with such boundaries.

'Urban Inverness', below, refers to the area centred on the former royal burgh and generally urban in character during the 1999 to 2007 period.

There were 23 wards related to the management area:

Lochaber wards 
There were eight wards related the Lochaber management area:

Nairn wards 

The Nairn management area was mostly rural.  Ward boundaries radiated from the town of Nairn (a former burgh), dividing the town between all four wards:

Ross and Cromarty wards 
There were 18 wards related to the Ross and Cromarty management area:

Skye and Lochalsh wards 

The Skye and Lochalsh management area included the islands of Skye, Raasay and Scalpay, the village of Kyle of Lochalsh on the mainland, and a rural area to the east of Kyle of Lochalsh. There were six wards related to the Skye and Lochalsh area:

Sutherland wards 
There were six wards related to the Sutherland management area:

See also
Politics of the Highland council area

Notes and references 

Highland council wards
Lists of wards in Scotland